Doğanlı can refer to:

 Doğanlı, Dinar
 Doğanlı, Düzce
 Doğanlı, Güney
 Doğanlı, Sur
 Doğanlı, Tufanbeyli